The 4th Annual Nickelodeon Kids' Choice Awards was held on April 23, 1990, at Universal Studios Hollywood. The show was hosted by Dave Coulier, Candace Cameron and David Faustino. The now-familiar orange blimp-shaped trophy was first awarded at this show.

Performers

Presenters
 Brooke Theiss and Michael DeLorenzo - presented Favorite Movie Actor and Favorite Movie
 Kellie Martin and Chris Burke - presented Favorite TV Actress
 Jared Rushton and Dreyfuss the dog - presented Favorite TV Actor
 Jaleel White and Danny Ponce - presented Favorite TV Show
 Kelly Brown and Christine Taylor - presented Favorite Female Athlete and Favorite Male Athlete
 Rain Pryor and Wil Wheaton - presented Favorite Song, Favorite Female Musician/Group and Favorite Male Musician/Group
Co-hosts Candace Cameron and David Faustino also presented the first award of the night, Favorite Movie Actress, as well as the award for Favorite Sports Team.

Winners and nominees
Winners are listed first, in bold. Other nominees are in alphabetical order.

Movies

Television

Music

Sports

References

Nickelodeon Kids' Choice Awards
Kids' Choice Awards
Kids' Choice Awards